Musique Vol. 1 1993–2005 is an anthology by Daft Punk released in Japan on 29 March 2006, in the United Kingdom on 3 April 2006, and in the United States on 4 April 2006. A special edition includes a bonus DVD with 12 music videos—two of which are new, "The Prime Time of Your Life" and "Robot Rock (Daft Punk Maximum Overdrive)". Due to time constraints on the audio CD, some of the tracks are shorter edits. The song "Digital Love" appears only in the digital release and Japan edition. The DVD edition was rated 15 by the BBFC, due to the content of "The Prime Time of Your Life" video.

Background

The name of the album comes from "Musique", a song that was initially released as the B-side to "Da Funk". Although it was released before Daft Punk's debut album Homework, "Musique" was not intended for it. Thomas Bangalter pointed out that sales of "Da Funk" were greater than that of the album, so the majority of listeners would have attained the song through the former. The song can also be found on the Wipeout 2097 video game soundtrack, which was released in 1996. A portion of "Musique" can be heard in the track "WDPK 83.7 FM" on Homework.

Track listing 

Note: The DVD is not available on the current Parlophone/Warner Music (which is the current owner of Daft Punk's Virgin catalog after the breakup of EMI) re-release

Charts

References

External links 
 
 

Daft Punk compilation albums
2006 greatest hits albums
Music video compilation albums
2006 video albums
Virgin Records compilation albums
Virgin Records video albums
Daft Punk video albums